Tevita Lotoatau Ofahengaue (born July 9, 1974) is a former American football tight end. He was the last (246th) pick in the 2001 National Football League draft, thus qualifying as that year's "Mr. Irrelevant". He was drafted out of Brigham Young University by the Arizona Cardinals.

Post-football
Ofahengaue currently lives in Utah with his wife Carey and their seven children. He and his wife own a private foster agency together, Crossroads Youth Services. Ofahengaue is currently serving as the football Director of Player Personnel at BYU.

Legal troubles
In July 2011, Ofahengaue, along with Reno Mahe, was charged with theft for allegedly playing a part in stealing more than $55,000 in gasoline from a construction company in 2010. In January 2014, all charges were dropped and dismissed in court by Judge Denise Lindberg.

References

1975 births
Living people
People from Laie
American football tight ends
BYU Cougars football players
Arizona Cardinals players
Jacksonville Jaguars players
Tongan emigrants to the United States
Tongan players of American football
Players of American football from Hawaii